Yury Matveyevich Mironov (born 10 July 1948) is a professional association football coach from Russia and a former Soviet player currently working as an assistant coach with FC Torpedo Moscow.

As a player, he played eight seasons in the Soviet Top League with FC Torpedo Moscow.

Honours

As a player
Soviet Top League champion: 1976 (autumn)
Soviet Top League bronze: 1977

As a manager
Russian Cup winner: 1992/1993

External links
Career summary by KLISF

1948 births
Living people
Soviet footballers
FC Khimik-Arsenal players
FC Torpedo Moscow players
FC Arsenal Tula players
Russian football managers
FC Torpedo Moscow managers
Russian Premier League managers
Association football defenders
FC Iskra Smolensk players